= Humunwala railway station =

Railway station in Pakistan

General information
- Coordinates: 29.36455°N 70.46258°E
- Owner: Ministry of Railways

Other information
- Station code: HWA

History
- Former names: Great Indian Peninsula Railway
Location

Humunwala railway station (Urdu: ہمایوں والا ریلوے اسٹیشن) is located in Pakistan.

== See also ==
- List of railway stations in Pakistan
- Pakistan Railways
